Charles Davis of Broome, New York was the Warden of Sing Sing in 1878.

References

}

Wardens of Sing Sing
Year of birth missing
Year of death missing